Irani may refer to the following:
 Anything related to Iran
 Irani (India), an ethno-religious group of Zoroastrian Iranian ancestry in the Indian subcontinent
 Irani, Santa Catarina
 Irani café

People with the surname

 Adi Irani (born 1942), Indian actor
Anosh Irani  (born 1974), Indo-Canadian writer
Ardeshir Irani (1886–1969), Indian filmmaker, director of India's first sound film
Aruna Irani (born 1946), Indian actress
Bakhtiyaar Irani (born 1979), Indian film and television actor, husband of Tannaz Irani
Boman Irani (born 1959), Indian actor
C R Irani (1931–2005), Indian journalist, editor-in-chief of The Statesman
Daisy Irani, Indian television actress and director
Daisy Irani (born 1950), Indian film actress, sister of Honey Irani
Delnaaz Irani (born 1971), Indian actress
Dinshah Irani (1881–1938), Indian lawyer, Zoroastrian benefactor in India and Iran
Faredoon Irani, Indian cinematographer
Firoz Irani, Indian actor and filmmaker
Honey Irani (born 1950), Indian actress and screenwriter
Jenni Irani (1923–1982), Indian cricketer
Kaikhosrov D. Irani (1922–2017), Indian-American philosopher
Kashmira Irani (born 1989), Indian film actress
Kayoze Irani (born 1987), Indian actor, voice artist and film director, son of Boman Irani
Meher Baba born Merwan Sheriar Irani (1894–1969), Indian spiritual leader
 Mehli Irani (1930–2021), Indian cricketer
Nariman Irani (–1977), Indian cinematographer and film producer
Oorvazi Irani (born 1977), Indian independent filmmaker
Ray R. Irani (born 1935), former chairman and chief executive officer of Occidental Petroleum
Ronnie Irani (born 1971), English cricketer
Sanaya Irani (born 1983), Indian actress
 Shayesteh Irani (born 1979), Iranian actress
Sheila F. Irani (1922–2003), Indian educator and humanitarian
 Smriti Irani (born 1976), Indian actress and politician
Tannaz Irani (born 1971), Indian actress, wife of Bakhtiyaar Irani

See also
 Iranian (disambiguation)

Ethnonymic surnames